Hiro Narita (born June 26, 1941) is an American cinematographer.

Early life and education
Narita was born in 1941, in Seoul, Chōsen (now part of South Korea) to Japanese parents.

In 1945, he and his family moved to Nara, Japan, and later to Tokyo. Following his father's early death and his mother's remarriage to a Japanese American, he immigrated in 1957 to Honolulu, Hawaii where he graduated from Kaimuki High School. He went on to the San Francisco Art Institute where he received a BFA in Graphic Design in 1964. He quickly landed a good position at a prominent local design firm, but the job lasted barely six months before he was drafted into the U.S. Army. For two years, he served as a designer and photographer at the Pentagon.

Career
An avid movie fan since childhood, Narita decided to go into filmmaking rather than go back into graphic design upon his return to San Francisco in the mid-sixties.  After an internship with John Korty and Victor J. Kemper on the Michael Ritchie movie The Candidate in 1971, he photographed the television movie Farewell to Manzanar in 1975, for which he received an Emmy Award nomination. 

In 1976, he was one of the camera operators on Martin Scorsese's documentary The Last Waltz about the last concert of The Band. Later, he worked on projects like Apocalypse Now, More American Graffiti, and the Neil Young documentary Rust Never Sleeps. For his cinematography on the movie Never Cry Wolf he won the Boston Society of Film Critics Award and the National Society of Film Critics Award in 1983. In 1989, he photographed the Visual Effects in the Steven Spielberg film Always. In the following years, he was the Director of Photography on successful films like Honey, I Shrunk the Kids, Star Trek VI: The Undiscovered Country, Dirty Pictures, and The Rocketeer.

Narita served as Director of Photography on the 1997 Live Action Short Film Academy Award winning Visas and Virtue.  He also directed the 1997 hour-long documentary film, Isamu Noguchi: Stones and Paper.

He has taught at San Francisco Art Institute, lectured, and given master classes at many institutions including Golden Eye in the Republic of Georgia.

He is a member of American Society of Cinematographers (ASC) and Academy of Motion Pictures and Sciences.

Notes

External links
Hiro Narita at the Internet Encyclopedia of Cinematographers

 Gerry Guida A Cinematographer Career: Conversation with Hiro Narita, ASC Artdigiland

1941 births
Living people
Japanese people of Korea under Japanese rule
Japanese emigrants to the United States
American cinematographers
People from Seoul
Japanese cinematographers